Calvin Henry Kauffman (March 1, 1869–1931) was an American botanist and mycologist. A fellow of the American Association for the Advancement of Science, he was affiliated with the University of Michigan from 1904 until his death, and was known for his studies of the family Agaricaceae.

See also
 :Category:Taxa named by Calvin Henry Kauffman

References

External links

1869 births
1931 deaths
American botanists
American mycologists
University of Michigan faculty
Fellows of the American Association for the Advancement of Science